The women's 500 metres in short track speed skating at the 2010 Winter Olympics began on 13 February, with the final held on 17 February, at the Pacific Coliseum.

Results

Heats

Quarterfinals

Semifinals

Finals

Final B (Classification Round)

Final A (Medal Round)

References

External links
 2010 Winter Olympics results: Women's 500 m Heats, from http://www.vancouver2010.com/; retrieved 2010-02-13.
 2010 Winter Olympics results: Women's 500 m Quarterfinals, from http://www.vancouver2010.com/; retrieved 2010-02-13.
 2010 Winter Olympics results: Women's 500 m Semifinals, from http://www.vancouver2010.com/; retrieved 2010-02-13.
 2010 Winter Olympics results: Women's 500 m Finals, from http://www.vancouver2010.com/; retrieved 2010-02-13.

Women's short track speed skating at the 2010 Winter Olympics